Oleksandr Mykolayovych Volkov (born 7 February 1989) is a professional Ukrainian football midfielder.

Career
He is a product of the FC Obolon Kyiv and FC Dynamo Kyiv sportive schools. He spent time with different Ukrainian teams that played in the Ukrainian First League. In November 2009, he signed a contract with the Ukrainian Premier League FC Zorya Luhansk.

Desna Chernihiv
In 2016-2017 he played Desna Chernihiv, the main club in Chernihiv. With the club, he got promoted in Ukrainian Premier League, after the season 2017–18 in Ukrainian First League.

Kolos Kovalivka (On Loan)
In summer 2019 we moved on loan to Kolos Kovalivka, where he played 10 matches and scored 1 goal against Karpaty Lviv giving the victory for 2-1 for his club. On 29 July 2020, with FC Kolos in overtime beat FC Mariupol 1–0 and qualified for the European competitions.

Desna Chernihiv
In summer 2020 he return to Desna Chernihiv and he made his debut in Ukrainian Premier League for the season 2020-21 in the match against Vorskla Poltava at the Stadion Yuri Gagarin. On 31 January 2021, he played in the friendly match against PFC Lokomotiv Tashkent. On 17 April 2021 he played against FC Mynai replacing Levan Arveladze at the 54 minute of the second half. In summer 2021 his contract was ended with the club of Desna Chernihiv, becoming the club with most appearances in his career.

LNZ Cherkasy
On 4 July 2021, he moved to LNZ Cherkasy, just promoted in Ukrainian Second League. On 30 August 2021 he made his debut with the new team against AFSC Kyiv replacing Oleksandr Nasonov at the 85 minute. On 31 August 2021 he played in the Third preliminary round, of Ukrainian Cup against Olimpik Donetsk in the season 2021–22 and qualified for the 63 round of the ukrainian cup. On 11 September 2021 he played against FC Chernihiv in Ukrainian Second League in the season 2021-22. On 22 September 2021 he played in Ukrainian Cup against Inhulets Petrove getting into the quarterfinal of the competition for the first time in the history of the club. On 1 December 2021 he played in the eight final of Ukrainian Cup against Dnipro-1 in the season 2021–22.

Honours
Desna Chernihiv
 Ukrainian First League: 2017–18

Olimpik Donetsk
 Ukrainian First League: 2013–14

References

External links
Oleksandr Volkov at FC Desna 

1989 births
Living people
Ukrainian footballers
Footballers from Kyiv
Association football midfielders
Ukrainian expatriate footballers
Expatriate footballers in Belarus
Ukrainian expatriate sportspeople in Belarus
Ukrainian Premier League players
FC Dynamo-3 Kyiv players
MFC Mykolaiv players
FC Zorya Luhansk players
FC Olimpik Donetsk players
FC Belshina Bobruisk players
FC Poltava players
FC Desna Chernihiv players
FC Kolos Kovalivka players
FC LNZ Cherkasy players
Ukraine youth international footballers
Ukrainian First League players
Ukrainian Second League players